Beacon Motors Ltd was a British automobile manufacturer based in Hindhead, Surrey from 1912-1913 moving to Liphook, Surrey until 1914. 

The first Beacon was equipped with an air cooled JAP V-twin engine which had a displacement of 1248 cc. The 7 feet 6 inch (2286 mm) wheelbase, 3 feet 10 inch (1150 mm) track chassis was a conventional one with half elliptic leaf spring suspension front and rear but the bodywork could be specified made from cane basketwork. Drive was to the rear axle through a variable ratio friction drive and chains.

Later models had a slightly smaller engine with 1089 cc capacity made by the French company Griffon.  The later cars had shaft drive and a three speed transmission located with the rear axle.

Production stopped on the outbreak of World War I.

Models

References

Vintage vehicles
Cyclecars
Defunct motor vehicle manufacturers of England
Vehicle manufacturing companies established in 1912
Defunct companies based in Surrey